The 1997 Hamilton municipal election was a municipal election held on November 10, 1997, to elect municipal officials for the City of Hamilton. Hamiltonions selected one mayor, one regional chairperson, and seventeen members of the Hamilton City Council, who were elected on a two-tier basis, as well as members of both the English and French Public and Catholic School Boards. The suburban communities of Ancaster, Flambrough, Glanbrook, Dundas and Stoney Creek, each elected town councils for the last time before amalgamation.

Voter turnout remained steady in 1997, amidst events such as Premier Mike Harris' Common Sense Revolution service cuts, the Plastimet Fire, and plebiscites on smoking by-laws and a proposed casino.

New measures
For the 1997 election, the City of Hamilton switched from paper ballots to a new automated voting system. This system saw voters mark their choices on a paper ballot, enclose it in a 'privacy sleeve' and feed it into a computer that automatically tabulated the results.

Referendums

|- style="text-align:center;background:#E9E9E9;"
! colspan="7" | Hamilton, Ontario, Municipal referendums, 1997
|- style="text-align:center;background:#E9E9E9;"
! rowspan="2" style="text-align:left;" | Question
! colspan="2" |  Yes
! colspan="2" |  No
! colspan="2" | Voter Turnout
|- style="background-color:#E9E9E9;"
| style="text-align:center;" | Votes
| style="text-align:center;" |%
| style="text-align:center;" |Votes
| style="text-align:center;" |%
| style="text-align:center;" |Votes
| style="text-align:center;" |%
|-
| style="text-align:left;" | Smoking Control Bylaw - Banning smoking in restaurants and bars
| style="text-align:right;" |50,817
| style="text-align:right;" |66.89%
| style="text-align:right;" |25,156
| style="text-align:right;" |33.11%
| style="text-align:right;" |75,973 
| style="text-align:right;" |
|-
| style="text-align:left;" | Provincial Casino - Approval to build a casino in Hamilton
| style="text-align:right;" |28275
| style="text-align:right;" |36.97%
| style="text-align:right;" |48,211
| style="text-align:right;" |63.03%
| style="text-align:right;" |76,486 
| style="text-align:right;" |
|-
|colspan="7" style="background-color:#E9E9E9" |
|- style="background:"#FFFFFF";"
| colspan="5" style="text-align:right;background-color:#FFFFFF"| Total Voters
!style="text-align:center;background-color:#FFFFFF"|
!style="text-align:center;background-color:#FFFFFF"|
|- 
| style="text-align:left;" colspan="7" |Note: Vote totals for each question were different as voters did not need to vote on each question 
|- 
| style="text-align:left;" colspan="13" |Sources:  
|}

Mayoral Election

Official Candidates

Incumbent Mayor Bob Morrow sought, and won, a sixth term in 1997. His campaign was centered around the establishment of a one-tier 'megacity', and the lowering of downtown taxes.
Civil Servant Dave Snowdon was an employee of Human Resources Development Canada and called the east Mountain home. The 31-year-old father of two focused on making the city a more inclusive community, especially in respects to youth, increased investment in the downtown core and promoted environmentally responsible issues.
Fitness Instructor Kristina Heaton was the first female contender for the position since 1978, and campaigned on uniting environmental groups across the city, establishing a monitoring system to investigate cases of animal abuse and increasing police foot-patrols in the downtown core.
Future city councillor Brian McHattie ran on an environmentally conscious platform that promoted practical spending, and supported an inquiry into the Plastimet disaster, improving municipal air quality and upgrading the city's sewer system.
Paul Decker was the automotive manager of a Canadian Tire store in Dundas, and ran in the 1994 Election, finishing second to Mayor Morrow. Though known in his community for his volunteer work and commitment to municipal affairs, he was arrested a year after the 1997 Election on charges of defrauding his employer for under $1,500.
College student Waylon MacDonald, who was training to be a machinist at the time of the election, advocated a reversal of the downtown conversion to one-way streets and focused on reducing the debt.
An unemployed moulder in 1997, Wendel Fields, who was also a former candidate for the Marxist-Leninist Party of Canada in the riding of Hamilton West in 1997, promoted the idea of establishing 'people's councils' to ensure Hamiltonians had a say in the direction of their tax-dollars, as well as lowering taxes for small businesses, while raising them for large corporations.

Results

|-
!rowspan="2" colspan="2"|Candidate
!colspan="3"|Popular vote
|-
! Votes
! %
! ±%
|-
| style="background-color:#FF9966;" |
| style="text-align:left;" | Bob Morrow (incumbent)
| style="text-align:right;" |58,486
| style="text-align:right;" |75.11%
| style="text-align:right;" |-12.11%
|-
| style="background-color:#5D8AA8;" |
| style="text-align:left;" | Dave Snowdon
| style="text-align:right;" |4,998
| style="text-align:right;" |6.41%
| style="text-align:right;" |n/a
|-
| style="background-color:#00563F;" |
| style="text-align:left;" | Kristina Heaton
| style="text-align:right;" |4,647
| style="text-align:right;" |5.98%
| style="text-align:right;" |n/a
|-
| style="background-color:#FF7F00;" |
| style="text-align:left;" | Brian McHattie
| style="text-align:right;" |4,255
| style="text-align:right;" |5.46%
| style="text-align:right;" |n/a
|-
| style="background-color:#5D8AA8;" |
| style="text-align:left;" | Paul Decker
| style="text-align:right;" |3,468
| style="text-align:right;" |4.45%
| style="text-align:right;" |-0.06%
|-
| style="background-color:#FCF75E;" |
| style="text-align:left;" | Waylon MacDonald
| style="text-align:right;" |1,407
| style="text-align:right;" |1,81%
| style="text-align:right;" |n/a
|-
| style="background-color:#FF0000;" |
| style="text-align:left;" | Wendell Fields
| style="text-align:right;" |611
| style="text-align:right;" |0.78%
| style="text-align:right;" |n/a
|-
| style="text-align:right;background-color:#FFFFFF;" colspan="2" |Total votes
| style="text-align:right;background-color:#FFFFFF;" |77,872
| style="text-align:right;background-color:#FFFFFF;" |100%
| style="text-align:right;background-color:#FFFFFF;" |
|-
| style="text-align:right;background-color:#FFFFFF;" colspan="2" |Registered voters
| style="text-align:right;background-color:#FFFFFF;" |n/a
| style="text-align:right;background-color:#FFFFFF;" |n/a
| style="text-align:right;background-color:#FFFFFF;" |n/a
|-
| style="text-align:left;" colspan="6" |Note: All Hamilton Municipal Elections are officially non-partisan.  Note: Candidate campaign colours are based on the prominent colour used in campaign items (signs, literature, etc.)and are used as a visual differentiation between candidates.
|-
| style="text-align:left;" colspan="13" |Sources: 
|}

City Council election

Ward 1

|-
!rowspan="2" colspan="2"|Candidate
!colspan="3"|Popular vote
|-
! Votes
! %
! ±%
|-
| style="background-color:#ff0000;" |
| style="text-align:left;" | Mary Kiss (Incumbent)
| style="text-align:right;" |4,560
| style="text-align:right;" |29.2%
| style="text-align:right;" | 
|-
| style="background-color:#FF0000;" |
| style="text-align:left;" | Marvin Caplan (Incumbent)
| style="text-align:right;" |4,125
| style="text-align:right;" |26.4%
| style="text-align:right;" |
|-
| style="background-color:#0fa826;" |
| style="text-align:left;" | Cam Nolan
| style="text-align:right;" | 3,848
| style="text-align:right;" | 25%
| style="text-align:right;" | -
|-
| style="background-color:#cc1bc0;" |
| style="text-align:left;" | Sarah Whatmough
| style="text-align:right;" | 3,059
| style="text-align:right;" | 19.4%
| style="text-align:right;" | -
|-
| style="text-align:right;background-color:#FFFFFF;" colspan="2" |Total votes
| style="text-align:right;background-color:#FFFFFF;" |15,589
| style="text-align:right;background-color:#FFFFFF;" |
| style="text-align:right;background-color:#FFFFFF;" |
|- 
| style="text-align:right;background-color:#FFFFFF;" colspan="2" |Registered voters
| style="text-align:right;background-color:#FFFFFF;" |
| style="text-align:right;background-color:#FFFFFF;" |
| style="text-align:right;background-color:#FFFFFF;" |
|- 
| style="text-align:left;" colspan="6" |Note: All Hamilton Municipal Elections are officially non-partisan.  Note: Candidate campaign colours are based on the prominent colour used in campaign items (signs, literature, etc.)and are used as a visual differentiation between candidates.
|- 
| style="text-align:left;" colspan="13" |Sources:
|}

 Mary Kiss successfully ran for a sixth term in 1997, promoting her personal record of constituency work and environmental advocacy, as well as highlighting the very small tax increases that have occurred during her tenure on council.
 Incumbent Marvin Caplan made a successful bid for a second term as Ward One's junior councillor in 1997, promoting his advocacy on downtown issues and promoting social justice.
 Second-time candidate Cam Nolan was the executive director of the Hamilton Construction Association at the time and ran on a fiscal responsibility and anti-incumbency platform.
 Newcomer Sarah Whatmough, owner of multiple gas stations across the city, campaigned against bureaucratic red-tape and promoted direct-democracy in dealing with municipal issues. As Sarah Thomson, she would later run for Mayor of Toronto in 2010 and as a Liberal candidate in the 2011 Ontario election.

Ward 2

|-
!rowspan="2" colspan="2"|Candidate
!colspan="3"|Popular vote
|-
! Votes
! %
! ±%
|-
| style="background-color:#F39237;" |
| style="text-align:left;" | Andrea Horwath
| style="text-align:right;" |3,587
| style="text-align:right;" |28.1%
| style="text-align:right;" | 
|-
| style="background-color:#D63230;" |
| style="text-align:left;" | Ron Corsini
| style="text-align:right;" |3,364
| style="text-align:right;" |26.4%
| style="text-align:right;" | 
|-
| style="background-color:#FF0000;" |
| style="text-align:left;" | Vince Agro (incumbent)
| style="text-align:right;" |3,346
| style="text-align:right;" |44.5%
| style="text-align:right;" |±0%
|-
| style="background-color:#002E63;" |
| style="text-align:left;" | Bill McCulloch (incumbent)
| style="text-align:right;" |2,605
| style="text-align:right;" |34.63%
| style="text-align:right;" |+0.9%
|-
| style="background-color:#4c7a8a"|
| style="text-align:left;" | Jason Capobianco
| style="text-align:right;" | 902
| style="text-align:right;" | 7.1%
| style="text-align:right;" | -
|-
| style="background-color:#794c8a;" |
| style="text-align:left;" | John Kenyon
| style="text-align:right;" | 512
| style="text-align:right;" | 4%
| style="text-align:right;" | -
|-
| style="background-color:#b2c953;" |
| style="text-align:left;" | Jim Savage
| style="text-align:right;" | 208
| style="text-align:right;" | 1.6%
| style="text-align:right;" | -
|-
| style="text-align:right;background-color:#FFFFFF;" colspan="2" |Total votes
| style="text-align:right;background-color:#FFFFFF;" |12,767
| style="text-align:right;background-color:#FFFFFF;" |
| style="text-align:right;background-color:#FFFFFF;" |
|- 
| style="text-align:right;background-color:#FFFFFF;" colspan="2" |Registered voters
| style="text-align:right;background-color:#FFFFFF;" |
| style="text-align:right;background-color:#FFFFFF;" |
| style="text-align:right;background-color:#FFFFFF;" |
|- 
| style="text-align:left;" colspan="6" |Note: All Hamilton Municipal Elections are officially non-partisan.  Note: Candidate campaign colours are based on the prominent colour used in campaign items (signs, literature, etc.)and are used as a visual differentiation between candidates.
|- 
| style="text-align:left;" colspan="13" |Sources:
|}

 Andrea Horwath, 35 years old at the time, was a community organizer, and campaigned on a platform of bringing change to City Council after nearly 3 decades of the same representation for Ward Two.
 Rob Corsini was the owner of Corsini Supermarkets and a member of the Ontario Liberal Party, who campaigned on restoring the economic health of the downtown core following the Plastimet fire, an industrial disaster that affected the northern portion of the ward, assisted heavily by Hamilton West MP Stan Keyes.
 Vince Agro, a councillor of 25 years, campaigned on the importance of dealing with the coming provincial downloading on a case-by-case basis, as well as highlighting his experience.
 A councillor for 31 years, Bill McCulloch, ran solely on his experience, maintaining that proven leadership was the most effective way to run a city. He caused some controversy by writing off Horwath and Corsini's candidacies, saying, "Let me suggest we need one person with experience. If all of a sudden we were to get rid of everyone with experience, the new people wouldn't know where the washroom is!"
 26-year-old financial planner Jason Capobianco ran against amalgamation and provincial downloading, saying he would refuse to accept any provincial proposal to change the status quo.
 John Kenyon was manager of the Payne Music House on King Street East and campaigned on bringing change and new ideas to the table, as well as lowering business taxes in the core
 Jim Savage, who was associated with the Corktown Community Association, ran on a reformist platform, calling for a new perspective in city politics and a reduction in business taxes.

Ward 3

|-
!rowspan="2" colspan="2"|Candidate
!colspan="3"|Popular vote
|-
! Votes
! %
! ±%
|-
| style="background-color:#FF0000;" |
| style="text-align:left;" | Bernie Morelli (incumbent)
| style="text-align:right;" | 4,229
| style="text-align:right;" |
| style="text-align:right;" | -
|-
| style="background-color:#D44D5C;" |
| style="text-align:left;" | Dennis Haining
| style="text-align:right;" | 1,989
| style="text-align:right;" |
| style="text-align:right;" | -
|-
| style="background-color:#FF0000;" |
| style="text-align:left;" | Sam Merulla
| style="text-align:right;" | 1,728
| style="text-align:right;" |
| style="text-align:right;" | -
|-
| style="background-color:#796fd1;" |
| style="text-align:left;" | Elena Lazar
| style="text-align:right;" | 1,372
| style="text-align:right;" |
| style="text-align:right;" | -
|-
| style="background-color:#d69004;" |
| style="text-align:left;" | Bob Stewart
| style="text-align:right;" | 985
| style="text-align:right;" |
| style="text-align:right;" | -
|-
| style="background-color:#86bd33;" |
| style="text-align:left;" | Joyce Rattray
| style="text-align:right;" | 917
| style="text-align:right;" |
| style="text-align:right;" | -
|-
| style="background-color:#5677fc;" |
| style="text-align:left;" | Dwain Burns
| style="text-align:right;" | 536
| style="text-align:right;" |
| style="text-align:right;" | -
|-
| style="background-color:#db63a7;" |
| style="text-align:left;" | Kattie Calleja
| style="text-align:right;" | 496
| style="text-align:right;" |
| style="text-align:right;" | -
|-
| style="background-color:#db63a7;" |
| style="text-align:left;" | Melvin Boudreau
| style="text-align:right;" | 213
| style="text-align:right;" |
| style="text-align:right;" | -
|-
| style="text-align:right;background-color:#FFFFFF;" colspan="2" |Total votes
| style="text-align:right;background-color:#FFFFFF;" |
| style="text-align:right;background-color:#FFFFFF;" |
| style="text-align:right;background-color:#FFFFFF;" |
|- 
| style="text-align:right;background-color:#FFFFFF;" colspan="2" |Registered voters
| style="text-align:right;background-color:#FFFFFF;" |
| style="text-align:right;background-color:#FFFFFF;" |
| style="text-align:right;background-color:#FFFFFF;" |
|- 
| style="text-align:left;" colspan="6" |Note: All Hamilton Municipal Elections are officially non-partisan.  Note: Candidate campaign colours are based on the prominent colour used in campaign items (signs, literature, etc.)and are used as a visual differentiation between candidates.
|- 
| style="text-align:left;" colspan="13" |Sources:
|}

Ward 4

|-
!rowspan="2" colspan="2"|Candidate
!colspan="3"|Popular vote
|-
! Votes
! %
! ±%
|-
| style="background-color:#F46F1B;" |
| style="text-align:left;" | Dave Wilson (incumbent)
| style="text-align:right;" | 4,892
| style="text-align:right;" |
| style="text-align:right;" | -
|-
| style="background-color:#FF0000;" |
| style="text-align:left;" | Geraldine Copps (incumbent)
| style="text-align:right;" | 3,659
| style="text-align:right;" |
| style="text-align:right;" | -
|-
| style="background-color:#800080;" |
| style="text-align:left;" | Murray Kilgour
| style="text-align:right;" | 2,720
| style="text-align:right;" |
| style="text-align:right;" | -
|-
| style="text-align:right;background-color:#FFFFFF;" colspan="2" |Total votes
| style="text-align:right;background-color:#FFFFFF;" |
| style="text-align:right;background-color:#FFFFFF;" |
| style="text-align:right;background-color:#FFFFFF;" |
|- 
| style="text-align:right;background-color:#FFFFFF;" colspan="2" |Registered voters
| style="text-align:right;background-color:#FFFFFF;" |
| style="text-align:right;background-color:#FFFFFF;" |
| style="text-align:right;background-color:#FFFFFF;" |
|- 
| style="text-align:left;" colspan="6" |Note: All Hamilton Municipal Elections are officially non-partisan.  Note: Candidate campaign colours are based on the prominent colour used in campaign items (signs, literature, etc.)and are used as a visual differentiation between candidates.
|- 
| style="text-align:left;" colspan="13" |Sources:
|}

Ward 5

|-
!rowspan="2" colspan="2"|Candidate
!colspan="3"|Popular vote
|-
! Votes
! %
! ±%
|-
| style="background-color:#FF0000;" |
| style="text-align:left;" | Chad Collins
| style="text-align:right;" | 5,347
| style="text-align:right;" |
| style="text-align:right;" | -
|-
| style="background-color:#66023C;" |
| style="text-align:left;" | Fred Eisenberger (incumbent)
| style="text-align:right;" | 4,546
| style="text-align:right;" |
| style="text-align:right;" | -
|-
| style="background-color:#f2eb5c;" |
| style="text-align:left;" | Rita Chimienti
| style="text-align:right;" | 2,866
| style="text-align:right;" |
| style="text-align:right;" | -
|-
| style="background-color:#6500ff;" |
| style="text-align:left;" | Rocco Restauri
| style="text-align:right;" | 2,192
| style="text-align:right;" |
| style="text-align:right;" | -
|-
| style="background-color:#edaf79;" |
| style="text-align:left;" | Margaret Cunningham
| style="text-align:right;" | 1,828
| style="text-align:right;" |
| style="text-align:right;" | -
|-
| style="text-align:right;background-color:#FFFFFF;" colspan="2" |Total votes
| style="text-align:right;background-color:#FFFFFF;" |
| style="text-align:right;background-color:#FFFFFF;" |
| style="text-align:right;background-color:#FFFFFF;" |
|- 
| style="text-align:right;background-color:#FFFFFF;" colspan="2" |Registered voters
| style="text-align:right;background-color:#FFFFFF;" |
| style="text-align:right;background-color:#FFFFFF;" |
| style="text-align:right;background-color:#FFFFFF;" |
|- 
| style="text-align:left;" colspan="6" |Note: All Hamilton Municipal Elections are officially non-partisan.  Note: Candidate campaign colours are based on the prominent colour used in campaign items (signs, literature, etc.)and are used as a visual differentiation between candidates.
|- 
| style="text-align:left;" colspan="13" |Sources:
|}

Ward 6

|-
!rowspan="2" colspan="2"|Candidate
!colspan="3"|Popular vote
|-
! Votes
! %
! ±%
|-
| style="background-color:#002E63;" |
| style="text-align:left;" | Tom Jackson (incumbent)
| style="text-align:right;" | 7,938
| style="text-align:right;" |
| style="text-align:right;" | -
|-
| style="background-color:#3F00FF;" |
| style="text-align:left;" | Bob Charters (incumbent)
| style="text-align:right;" | 6,093
| style="text-align:right;" |
| style="text-align:right;" | -
|-
| style="background-color:#309113;" |
| style="text-align:left;" | Paul Lewis Settimi
| style="text-align:right;" | 4958
| style="text-align:right;" |
| style="text-align:right;" | -
|-
| style="background-color:#663854;" |
| style="text-align:left;" | Charles Eleveld
| style="text-align:right;" | 1,789
| style="text-align:right;" |
| style="text-align:right;" | -
|-
| style="text-align:right;background-color:#FFFFFF;" colspan="2" |Total votes
| style="text-align:right;background-color:#FFFFFF;" |
| style="text-align:right;background-color:#FFFFFF;" |
| style="text-align:right;background-color:#FFFFFF;" |
|- 
| style="text-align:right;background-color:#FFFFFF;" colspan="2" |Registered voters
| style="text-align:right;background-color:#FFFFFF;" |
| style="text-align:right;background-color:#FFFFFF;" |
| style="text-align:right;background-color:#FFFFFF;" |
|- 
| style="text-align:left;" colspan="6" |Note: All Hamilton Municipal Elections are officially non-partisan.  Note: Candidate campaign colours are based on the prominent colour used in campaign items (signs, literature, etc.)and are used as a visual differentiation between candidates.
|- 
| style="text-align:left;" colspan="13" |Sources:
|}

Ward 7

|-
!rowspan="2" colspan="2"|Candidate
!colspan="3"|Popular vote
|-
! Votes
! %
! ±%
|-
| style="background-color:#6495ED;" |
| style="text-align:left;" | Terry Anderson (incumbent)
| style="text-align:right;" | 8,721
| style="text-align:right;" |
| style="text-align:right;" | -
|-
| style="background-color:#FF0800;" |
| style="text-align:left;" | Bill Kelly
| style="text-align:right;" | 8,112
| style="text-align:right;" |
| style="text-align:right;" | -
|-
| style="background-color:#00008B;" |
| style="text-align:left;" | Henry Merling (incumbent)
| style="text-align:right;" | 6,040
| style="text-align:right;" |
| style="text-align:right;" | -
|-
| style="background-color:#0047AB;" |
| style="text-align:left;" | Mark Whittle
| style="text-align:right;" | 1,203
| style="text-align:right;" |
| style="text-align:right;" | -
|-
| style="background-color:#63b04c;" |
| style="text-align:left;" | Eduardo Navarro
| style="text-align:right;" | 1,182
| style="text-align:right;" |
| style="text-align:right;" | -
|-
| style="text-align:right;background-color:#FFFFFF;" colspan="2" |Total votes
| style="text-align:right;background-color:#FFFFFF;" |
| style="text-align:right;background-color:#FFFFFF;" |
| style="text-align:right;background-color:#FFFFFF;" |
|- 
| style="text-align:right;background-color:#FFFFFF;" colspan="2" |Registered voters
| style="text-align:right;background-color:#FFFFFF;" |
| style="text-align:right;background-color:#FFFFFF;" |
| style="text-align:right;background-color:#FFFFFF;" |
|- 
| style="text-align:left;" colspan="6" |Note: All Hamilton Municipal Elections are officially non-partisan.  Note: Candidate campaign colours are based on the prominent colour used in campaign items (signs, literature, etc.)and are used as a visual differentiation between candidates.
|- 
| style="text-align:left;" colspan="13" |Sources:
|}

Ward 8

|-
!rowspan="2" colspan="2"|Candidate
!colspan="3"|Popular vote
|-
! Votes
! %
! ±%
|-
| style="background-color:#FF0000;" |
| style="text-align:left;" | Frank D'Amico (incumbent)
| style="text-align:right;" | 8,400
| style="text-align:right;" |
| style="text-align:right;" | -
|-
| style="background-color:#FFD8BE;" |
| style="text-align:left;" | Duke O'Sullivan
| style="text-align:right;" | 6,155
| style="text-align:right;" |
| style="text-align:right;" | -
|-
| style="background-color:#8DB600;" |
| style="text-align:left;" | Tom Murray
| style="text-align:right;" | 3,463
| style="text-align:right;" |
| style="text-align:right;" | -
|-
| style="background-color:#FF0000;" |
| style="text-align:left;" | Mike Oddi
| style="text-align:right;" | 2,230
| style="text-align:right;" |
| style="text-align:right;" | -
|-
| style="background-color:#22700a;" |
| style="text-align:left;" | Judith Preston
| style="text-align:right;" | 1,904
| style="text-align:right;" |
| style="text-align:right;" | -
|-
| style="background-color:#5ddff0;" |
| style="text-align:left;" | Tony Di Prospero
| style="text-align:right;" | 749
| style="text-align:right;" |
| style="text-align:right;" | -
|-
| style="background-color:#791E7D;" |
| style="text-align:left;" | Chris Kiriakopoulos
| style="text-align:right;" | 696
| style="text-align:right;" |
| style="text-align:right;" | -
|-
| style="background-color:#4d2a91;" |
| style="text-align:left;" | Vish Bagal
| style="text-align:right;" | 632
| style="text-align:right;" |
| style="text-align:right;" | -
|-
| style="text-align:right;background-color:#FFFFFF;" colspan="2" |Total votes
| style="text-align:right;background-color:#FFFFFF;" |
| style="text-align:right;background-color:#FFFFFF;" |
| style="text-align:right;background-color:#FFFFFF;" |
|- 
| style="text-align:right;background-color:#FFFFFF;" colspan="2" |Registered voters
| style="text-align:right;background-color:#FFFFFF;" |
| style="text-align:right;background-color:#FFFFFF;" |
| style="text-align:right;background-color:#FFFFFF;" |
|- 
| style="text-align:left;" colspan="6" |Note: All Hamilton Municipal Elections are officially non-partisan.  Note: Candidate campaign colours are based on the prominent colour used in campaign items (signs, literature, etc.)and are used as a visual differentiation between candidates.
|- 
| style="text-align:left;" colspan="13" |Sources:
|}

Public School Trustee Elections

|-
!rowspan="2" colspan="2"|Candidate
!colspan="3"|Popular vote
|-
! Votes
! %
! ±%
|-
| style="background-color:#B57EDC;" |
| style="text-align:left;" | Judith Bishop (Incumbent)
| style="text-align:right;" | 8,042
| style="text-align:right;" |
| style="text-align:right;" | -
|-
| style="background-color:#4ec6f2;" |
| style="text-align:left;" | John Tickle
| style="text-align:right;" | 2,278
| style="text-align:right;" |
| style="text-align:right;" | -
|-
| style="text-align:right;background-color:#FFFFFF;" colspan="2" |Total votes
| style="text-align:right;background-color:#FFFFFF;" |
| style="text-align:right;background-color:#FFFFFF;" |
| style="text-align:right;background-color:#FFFFFF;" |
|- 
| style="text-align:right;background-color:#FFFFFF;" colspan="2" |Registered voters
| style="text-align:right;background-color:#FFFFFF;" |
| style="text-align:right;background-color:#FFFFFF;" |
| style="text-align:right;background-color:#FFFFFF;" |
|- 
| style="text-align:left;" colspan="6" |Note: All Hamilton Municipal Elections are officially non-partisan.  Note: Candidate campaign colours are based on the prominent colour used in campaign items (signs, literature, etc.)and are used as a visual differentiation between candidates.
|- 
| style="text-align:left;" colspan="13" |Sources:
|}

|-
!rowspan="2" colspan="2"|Candidate
!colspan="3"|Popular vote
|-
! Votes
! %
! ±%
|-
| style="background-color:#fa4a1e;" |
| style="text-align:left;" | Eleanor Johnstone
| style="text-align:right;" | 1,595
| style="text-align:right;" |
| style="text-align:right;" | -
|-
| style="background-color:#FF7F00;" |
| style="text-align:left;" | Robert Barlow
| style="text-align:right;" | 1,056
| style="text-align:right;" |
| style="text-align:right;" | -
|-
| style="background-color:#397520;" |
| style="text-align:left;" | Julie Gordon
| style="text-align:right;" | 703
| style="text-align:right;" |
| style="text-align:right;" | -
|-
| style="background-color:#0d52bf;" |
| style="text-align:left;" | Neville Nunes
| style="text-align:right;" | 532
| style="text-align:right;" |
| style="text-align:right;" | -
|-
| style="text-align:right;background-color:#FFFFFF;" colspan="2" |Total votes
| style="text-align:right;background-color:#FFFFFF;" |
| style="text-align:right;background-color:#FFFFFF;" |
| style="text-align:right;background-color:#FFFFFF;" |
|- 
| style="text-align:right;background-color:#FFFFFF;" colspan="2" |Registered voters
| style="text-align:right;background-color:#FFFFFF;" |
| style="text-align:right;background-color:#FFFFFF;" |
| style="text-align:right;background-color:#FFFFFF;" |
|- 
| style="text-align:left;" colspan="6" |Note: All Hamilton Municipal Elections are officially non-partisan.  Note: Candidate campaign colours are based on the prominent colour used in campaign items (signs, literature, etc.)and are used as a visual differentiation between candidates.
|- 
| style="text-align:left;" colspan="13" |Sources:
|}

|-
!rowspan="2" colspan="2"|Candidate
!colspan="3"|Popular vote
!rowspan="2" colspan="2"|Expenditures
|-
! Votes
! %
! ±%
|-
| style="background-color:#8DB600"|
| style="text-align:left;" | Ray E. Mulholland (Incumbent)
!colspan="3" style="text-align:center;" | Acclaimed
|-
| style="text-align:right;background-color:#FFFFFF;" colspan="2" |Total votes
| style="text-align:right;background-color:#FFFFFF;" |
| style="text-align:right;background-color:#FFFFFF;" |
| style="text-align:right;background-color:#FFFFFF;" |
|- 
| style="text-align:right;background-color:#FFFFFF;" colspan="2" |Registered voters
| style="text-align:right;background-color:#FFFFFF;" |
| style="text-align:right;background-color:#FFFFFF;" |
| style="text-align:right;background-color:#FFFFFF;" |
|- 
| style="text-align:left;" colspan="6" |Note: All Hamilton Municipal Elections are officially non-partisan.  Note: Candidate campaign colours are based on the prominent colour used in campaign items (signs, literature, etc.)and are used as a visual differentiation between candidates.
|- 
| style="text-align:left;" colspan="13" |Sources:
|}

Incumbent Ward 5 trustee, Reverend Joe Rogers, sought re-election in 1997. First elected in 1968, Rogers was the executive-director of St. Matthew's House and an Anglican priest in area churches. Mark Davies, the former executive director of the Mental Health Rights Coalition of Hamilton-Wentworth and independent candidate in Wentworth East in the 1995 Ontario provincial election had initially filed to contest the seat, but withdrew before the close of nominations.

|-
!rowspan="2" colspan="2"|Candidate
|-
! Votes
! %
! ±%
|-
| style="background-color:#FFFFFF;" |
| style="text-align:left;" | Joe Rogers (Incumbent)
!colspan="3" style="text-align:center;" | Acclaimed
|-
| style="text-align:right;background-color:#FFFFFF;" colspan="2" |Total votes
| style="text-align:right;background-color:#FFFFFF;" |
| style="text-align:right;background-color:#FFFFFF;" |
| style="text-align:right;background-color:#FFFFFF;" |
|- 
| style="text-align:right;background-color:#FFFFFF;" colspan="2" |Registered voters
| style="text-align:right;background-color:#FFFFFF;" |
| style="text-align:right;background-color:#FFFFFF;" |
| style="text-align:right;background-color:#FFFFFF;" |
|- 
| style="text-align:left;" colspan="6" |Note: All Hamilton Municipal Elections are officially non-partisan.  Note: Candidate campaign colours are based on the prominent colour used in campaign items (signs, literature, etc.)and are used as a visual differentiation between candidates.
|- 
| style="text-align:left;" colspan="13" |Sources:
|}

|-
!rowspan="2" colspan="2"|Candidate
|-
! Votes
! %
! ±%
|-
| style="background-color:#00BFFF;" |
| style="text-align:left;" | Laura Peddle
| style="text-align:right;" | 2,954
| style="text-align:right;" |
| style="text-align:right;" | -
|-
| style="background-color:#f5a020;" |
| style="text-align:left;" | Janice Wall
| style="text-align:right;" | 2,204
| style="text-align:right;" |
| style="text-align:right;" | -
|-
| style="background-color:#e86d61;" |
| style="text-align:left;" | Marla Robinson
| style="text-align:right;" | 1,783
| style="text-align:right;" |
| style="text-align:right;" | -
|-
| style="text-align:right;background-color:#FFFFFF;" colspan="2" |Total votes
| style="text-align:right;background-color:#FFFFFF;" |
| style="text-align:right;background-color:#FFFFFF;" |
| style="text-align:right;background-color:#FFFFFF;" |
|- 
| style="text-align:right;background-color:#FFFFFF;" colspan="2" |Registered voters
| style="text-align:right;background-color:#FFFFFF;" |
| style="text-align:right;background-color:#FFFFFF;" |
| style="text-align:right;background-color:#FFFFFF;" |
|- 
| style="text-align:left;" colspan="6" |Note: All Hamilton Municipal Elections are officially non-partisan.  Note: Candidate campaign colours are based on the prominent colour used in campaign items (signs, literature, etc.)and are used as a visual differentiation between candidates.
|- 
| style="text-align:left;" colspan="13" |Sources:
|}

|-
!rowspan="2" colspan="2"|Candidate
!colspan="3"|Popular vote=
|-
! Votes
! %
! ±%
|-
| style="background-color:#FFFFFF"|
| style="text-align:left;" | Lillian Orban (Incumbent)
!colspan="3" style="text-align:center;" | Acclaimed
|-
| style="text-align:right;background-color:#FFFFFF;" colspan="2" |Total votes
| style="text-align:right;background-color:#FFFFFF;" |
| style="text-align:right;background-color:#FFFFFF;" |
| style="text-align:right;background-color:#FFFFFF;" |
|- 
| style="text-align:right;background-color:#FFFFFF;" colspan="2" |Registered voters
| style="text-align:right;background-color:#FFFFFF;" |
| style="text-align:right;background-color:#FFFFFF;" |
| style="text-align:right;background-color:#FFFFFF;" |
|- 
| style="text-align:left;" colspan="6" |Note: All Hamilton Municipal Elections are officially non-partisan.  Note: Candidate campaign colours are based on the prominent colour used in campaign items (signs, literature, etc.)and are used as a visual differentiation between candidates.
|- 
| style="text-align:left;" colspan="13" |Sources:
|}

|-
!rowspan="2" colspan="2"|Candidate
!colspan="3"|Popular vote
|-
! Votes
! %
! ±%
|-
| style="background-color:#FFFFFF"|
| style="text-align:left;" | Wes Hicks (Incumbent)
!colspan="3" style="text-align:center;" | Acclaimed
|-
| style="text-align:right;background-color:#FFFFFF;" colspan="2" |Total votes
| style="text-align:right;background-color:#FFFFFF;" |
| style="text-align:right;background-color:#FFFFFF;" |
| style="text-align:right;background-color:#FFFFFF;" |
|- 
| style="text-align:right;background-color:#FFFFFF;" colspan="2" |Registered voters
| style="text-align:right;background-color:#FFFFFF;" |
| style="text-align:right;background-color:#FFFFFF;" |
| style="text-align:right;background-color:#FFFFFF;" |
|- 
| style="text-align:left;" colspan="6" |Note: All Hamilton Municipal Elections are officially non-partisan.  Note: Candidate campaign colours are based on the prominent colour used in campaign items (signs, literature, etc.)and are used as a visual differentiation between candidates.
|- 
| style="text-align:left;" colspan="13" |Sources:
|}

Catholic School Trustee Elections

|-
!rowspan="2" colspan="2"|Candidate
!colspan="3"|Popular vote
|-
! Votes
! %
! ±%
|-
| style="background-color:#3c27f5;" |
| style="text-align:left;" | Leo Blain
| style="text-align:right;" | 1,783
| style="text-align:right;" |
| style="text-align:right;" | -
|-
| style="background-color:#319aa8;" |
| style="text-align:left;" | William Laidlaw
| style="text-align:right;" | 1,596
| style="text-align:right;" |
| style="text-align:right;" | -
|-
| style="text-align:right;background-color:#FFFFFF;" colspan="2" |Total votes
| style="text-align:right;background-color:#FFFFFF;" |
| style="text-align:right;background-color:#FFFFFF;" |
| style="text-align:right;background-color:#FFFFFF;" |
|- 
| style="text-align:right;background-color:#FFFFFF;" colspan="2" |Registered voters
| style="text-align:right;background-color:#FFFFFF;" |
| style="text-align:right;background-color:#FFFFFF;" |
| style="text-align:right;background-color:#FFFFFF;" |
|- 
| style="text-align:left;" colspan="6" |Note: All Hamilton Municipal Elections are officially non-partisan.  Note: Candidate campaign colours are based on the prominent colour used in campaign items (signs, literature, etc.)and are used as a visual differentiation between candidates.
|- 
| style="text-align:left;" colspan="13" |Sources:
|}

|-
!rowspan="2" colspan="2"|Candidate
!colspan="3"|Popular vote
|-
! Votes
! %
! ±%
|-
| style="background-color:#ff0303;" |
| style="text-align:left;" | Ralph Agostino
| style="text-align:right;" | 2,515
| style="text-align:right;" |
| style="text-align:right;" | -
|-
| style="background-color:#23a88b;" |
| style="text-align:left;" | Danuta Bortolussi
| style="text-align:right;" | 1,842
| style="text-align:right;" |
| style="text-align:right;" | -
|-
| style="text-align:right;background-color:#FFFFFF;" colspan="2" |Total votes
| style="text-align:right;background-color:#FFFFFF;" |
| style="text-align:right;background-color:#FFFFFF;" |
| style="text-align:right;background-color:#FFFFFF;" |
|- 
| style="text-align:right;background-color:#FFFFFF;" colspan="2" |Registered voters
| style="text-align:right;background-color:#FFFFFF;" |
| style="text-align:right;background-color:#FFFFFF;" |
| style="text-align:right;background-color:#FFFFFF;" |
|- 
| style="text-align:left;" colspan="6" |Note: All Hamilton Municipal Elections are officially non-partisan.  Note: Candidate campaign colours are based on the prominent colour used in campaign items (signs, literature, etc.)and are used as a visual differentiation between candidates.
|- 
| style="text-align:left;" colspan="13" |Sources:
|}

|-
!rowspan="2" colspan="2"|Candidate
!colspan="3"|Popular vote
|-
! Votes
! %
! ±%
|-
| style="background-color:#fc0000;" |
| style="text-align:left;" | Rose Agostino
| style="text-align:right;" | 1,915
| style="text-align:right;" |
| style="text-align:right;" | -
|-
| style="background-color:#57b57e;" |
| style="text-align:left;" | Joseph Spatazzo
| style="text-align:right;" | 1,856
| style="text-align:right;" |
| style="text-align:right;" | -
|-
| style="background-color:#6d1670;" |
| style="text-align:left;" | Benedicta Egbo
| style="text-align:right;" | 382
| style="text-align:right;" |
| style="text-align:right;" | -
|-
| style="text-align:right;background-color:#FFFFFF;" colspan="2" |Total votes
| style="text-align:right;background-color:#FFFFFF;" |
| style="text-align:right;background-color:#FFFFFF;" |
| style="text-align:right;background-color:#FFFFFF;" |
|- 
| style="text-align:right;background-color:#FFFFFF;" colspan="2" |Registered voters
| style="text-align:right;background-color:#FFFFFF;" |
| style="text-align:right;background-color:#FFFFFF;" |
| style="text-align:right;background-color:#FFFFFF;" |
|- 
| style="text-align:left;" colspan="6" |Note: All Hamilton Municipal Elections are officially non-partisan.  Note: Candidate campaign colours are based on the prominent colour used in campaign items (signs, literature, etc.)and are used as a visual differentiation between candidates.
|- 
| style="text-align:left;" colspan="13" |Sources:
|}

|-
!rowspan="2" colspan="2"|Candidate
!colspan="3"|Popular vote
|-
! Votes
! %
! ±%
|-
| style="background-color:#FFD12A;" |
| style="text-align:left;" | Kyran Kennedy
| style="text-align:right;" | 2,191
| style="text-align:right;" |
| style="text-align:right;" | -
|-
| style="background-color:#41f4f4;" |
| style="text-align:left;" | Joseph Baiardo
| style="text-align:right;" | 1,779
| style="text-align:right;" |
| style="text-align:right;" | -
|-
| style="text-align:right;background-color:#FFFFFF;" colspan="2" |Total votes
| style="text-align:right;background-color:#FFFFFF;" |
| style="text-align:right;background-color:#FFFFFF;" |
| style="text-align:right;background-color:#FFFFFF;" |
|- 
| style="text-align:right;background-color:#FFFFFF;" colspan="2" |Registered voters
| style="text-align:right;background-color:#FFFFFF;" |
| style="text-align:right;background-color:#FFFFFF;" |
| style="text-align:right;background-color:#FFFFFF;" |
|- 
| style="text-align:left;" colspan="6" |Note: All Hamilton Municipal Elections are officially non-partisan.  Note: Candidate campaign colours are based on the prominent colour used in campaign items (signs, literature, etc.)and are used as a visual differentiation between candidates.
|- 
| style="text-align:left;" colspan="13" |Sources:
|}

|-
!rowspan="2" colspan="2"|Candidate
!colspan="3"|Popular vote
|-
! Votes
! %
! ±%
|-
| style="background-color:#FFFFFF"|
| style="text-align:left;" | Pat Daly (Incumbent)
!colspan="3" style="text-align:center;" | Acclaimed
|-
| style="text-align:right;background-color:#FFFFFF;" colspan="2" |Total votes
| style="text-align:right;background-color:#FFFFFF;" |
| style="text-align:right;background-color:#FFFFFF;" |
| style="text-align:right;background-color:#FFFFFF;" |
|- 
| style="text-align:right;background-color:#FFFFFF;" colspan="2" |Registered voters
| style="text-align:right;background-color:#FFFFFF;" |
| style="text-align:right;background-color:#FFFFFF;" |
| style="text-align:right;background-color:#FFFFFF;" |
|- 
| style="text-align:left;" colspan="5" |Note: All Hamilton Municipal Elections are officially non-partisan.  Note: Candidate campaign colours are based on the prominent colour used in campaign items (signs, literature, etc.)and are used as a visual differentiation between candidates.
|- 
| style="text-align:left;" colspan="13" |Sources:
|}

|-
!rowspan="2" colspan="2"|Candidate
!colspan="3"|Popular vote
|-
! Votes
! %
! ±%
|-
| style="background-color:#64abd1;" |
| style="text-align:left;" | Tom Gallagher
| style="text-align:right;" | 2,595
| style="text-align:right;" |
| style="text-align:right;" | -
|-
| style="background-color:#a517c2;" |
| style="text-align:left;" | Michelle Rizzato
| style="text-align:right;" | 1,554
| style="text-align:right;" |
| style="text-align:right;" | -
|-
| style="background-color:#78710c;" |
| style="text-align:left;" | Phil Consalvo
| style="text-align:right;" | 462
| style="text-align:right;" |
| style="text-align:right;" | -
|-
| style="text-align:right;background-color:#FFFFFF;" colspan="2" |Total votes
| style="text-align:right;background-color:#FFFFFF;" |12,767
| style="text-align:right;background-color:#FFFFFF;" |
| style="text-align:right;background-color:#FFFFFF;" |
|- 
| style="text-align:right;background-color:#FFFFFF;" colspan="2" |Registered voters
| style="text-align:right;background-color:#FFFFFF;" |
| style="text-align:right;background-color:#FFFFFF;" |
| style="text-align:right;background-color:#FFFFFF;" |
|- 
| style="text-align:left;" colspan="6" |Note: All Hamilton Municipal Elections are officially non-partisan.  Note: Candidate campaign colours are based on the prominent colour used in campaign items (signs, literature, etc.)and are used as a visual differentiation between candidates.
|- 
| style="text-align:left;" colspan="13" |Sources:
|}

French Public School Trustee Election

|-
!rowspan="2" colspan="2"|Candidate
!colspan="3"|Popular vote
|-
! Votes
! %
! ±%
|-
| style="background-color:#086b03;" |
| style="text-align:left;" | Jean Desmarais
| style="text-align:right;" | 87
| style="text-align:right;" |
| style="text-align:right;" | -
|-
| style="background-color:#146c9c;" |
| style="text-align:left;" | Agnes Gizard
| style="text-align:right;" | 56
| style="text-align:right;" |
| style="text-align:right;" | -
|-
| style="text-align:right;background-color:#FFFFFF;" colspan="2" |Total votes
| style="text-align:right;background-color:#FFFFFF;" |
| style="text-align:right;background-color:#FFFFFF;" |
| style="text-align:right;background-color:#FFFFFF;" |
|- 
| style="text-align:right;background-color:#FFFFFF;" colspan="2" |Registered voters
| style="text-align:right;background-color:#FFFFFF;" |
| style="text-align:right;background-color:#FFFFFF;" |
| style="text-align:right;background-color:#FFFFFF;" |
|- 
| style="text-align:left;" colspan="6" |Note: All Hamilton Municipal Elections are officially non-partisan.  Note: Candidate campaign colours are based on the prominent colour used in campaign items (signs, literature, etc.)and are used as a visual differentiation between candidates.
|- 
| style="text-align:left;" colspan="13" |Sources:
|}

French Catholic School Trustee Election

|-
!rowspan="2" colspan="2"|Candidate
!colspan="3"|Popular vote
|-
! Votes
! %
! ±%
|-
| style="background-color:#0892D0;" |
| style="text-align:left;" | Marcel Levesque
| style="text-align:right;" | 363
| style="text-align:right;" |
| style="text-align:right;" | -
|-
| style="background-color:#c85ccc;" |
| style="text-align:left;" | Pascale Harster
| style="text-align:right;" | 229
| style="text-align:right;" |
| style="text-align:right;" | -
|-
| style="text-align:right;background-color:#FFFFFF;" colspan="2" |Total votes
| style="text-align:right;background-color:#FFFFFF;" |
| style="text-align:right;background-color:#FFFFFF;" |
| style="text-align:right;background-color:#FFFFFF;" |
|- 
| style="text-align:right;background-color:#FFFFFF;" colspan="2" |Registered voters
| style="text-align:right;background-color:#FFFFFF;" |
| style="text-align:right;background-color:#FFFFFF;" |
| style="text-align:right;background-color:#FFFFFF;" |
|- 
| style="text-align:left;" colspan="6" |Note: All Hamilton Municipal Elections are officially non-partisan.  Note: Candidate campaign colours are based on the prominent colour used in campaign items (signs, literature, etc.)and are used as a visual differentiation between candidates.
|- 
| style="text-align:left;" colspan="13" |Sources:
|}

Suburban Town Council Elections

Ancaster

Despite being acclaimed, Wade fought provincial downloading and grappled with Ancaster's new commercial development, the Meadowlands Power Centre.

See also
List of Hamilton, Ontario municipal elections

Notes

1997 Ontario municipal elections
1997
November 1997 events in Canada